Carlos Navarrete Ruiz (born 26 September 1955) is a Mexican politician affiliated with the Party of the Democratic Revolution (PRD). As of 2013 he served as Senator of the LX and LXI Legislatures of the Mexican Congress representing Guanajuato. He also served as Deputy between 1994 and 1997.

From October 2014 until November 2015 he serves as President of the PRD.

References

1955 births
Living people
Politicians from Guanajuato
Members of the Senate of the Republic (Mexico)
Members of the Chamber of Deputies (Mexico)
Presidents of the Senate of the Republic (Mexico)
People from Salvatierra, Guanajuato
Presidents of the Party of the Democratic Revolution
20th-century Mexican politicians
21st-century Mexican politicians
Members of the Congress of Guanajuato